Sékou Oumar Dramé (born 23 December 1973 in Taouyah) is a retired Guinean football player.

Career
Between 1995 and 1998 he was a player of Polish team Lech Poznań. In 51 games for Lech he scored 2 goals. During his stay in Poland he played also for Petrochemia Płock, Dyskobolia Grodzisk and KSZO Ostrowiec Świętokrzyski. In Polish I Liga he appeared 63 times. From 2004 until 2007, Dramé played for Persis Solo in Indonesia.

International career
He was part of the Guinean 2004 African Nations Cup team, who finished second in their group in the first round of competition, before losing in the quarter finals to Mali.

References

External links

1973 births
Living people
Guinean footballers
Guinean expatriate footballers
Guinea international footballers
1994 African Cup of Nations players
1998 African Cup of Nations players
2004 African Cup of Nations players
Ekstraklasa players
Lech Poznań players
Wisła Płock players
Dyskobolia Grodzisk Wielkopolski players
KSZO Ostrowiec Świętokrzyski players
Guinean expatriate sportspeople in Poland
Guinean expatriate sportspeople in Ivory Coast
Expatriate footballers in Ivory Coast
Expatriate footballers in Poland
Expatriate footballers in Indonesia
Association football defenders